Pierre Braunberger (29 July 1905, Paris – 16 November 1990, Aubervilliers) was a French producer, executive producer, and actor.

Biography 
Born into a family of physicians, Braunberger at the age of seven was already determined not have the same life as his father, and not to take up medicine as a career. He saw a screening of Fantômas at the Gaumont Théâtre, the first cinema to open in Paris, and decided to work in the cinema.

After the First World War, at the age of 15, he produced and directed his first film: Frankfurt in Germany. He left for successive adventures in Berlin, London at Brocklis establishments, where he worked.

In 1923, he left for New York, where he worked for a few weeks at Fox Film Corporation, and became a director of production along with Ferdinand H. Adam where he also worked on films with Frank Merrill.

In the course of his films in Los Angeles, he came to know Irving Thalberg who employed him at Metro-Goldwyn-Mayer as one of his assistants. He stayed there for eighteen months, and established contacts with one of the greatest directors of the time.

Wanting to direct and produce in France, he returned to Paris and got to know Jean Renoir, with whom he worked on Avec qui il va tourner, The Whirlpool of Fate, Nana and Tire-au-flanc.

In 1929, Braunberger created Productions Pierre Braunberger and Néofilms for the production of his first French-speaking film (La route est belle by Robert Florey).

In 1930, Braunberger became head of the Pantheon Cinema and continued there for sixty years. He renovated the lobby, created 450 seats, and installed Western Electric projectors and sound equipment. Although subtitles were yet to be invented, he was the first to show foreign films in their original versions.

One year later, he met with Roger Richebé to produce under the name of Établissements Braunberger-Richebé. A few films were produced, such as le Blanc et le noir by Robert Florey, Isn't Life a Bitch? by Jean Renoir, and Chocolatière et Fanny by Marc Allégret. In 1933, still only 28, he decided to continue alone, and formed studios de Billancourt, which became Paris-Studio-Cinéma. During World War two he was not able to produce a film because he was Jewish.

At the end of the Second World War, Braunberger transformed a local Gestapo office into the Cinema Studio  "Studio Lhmond", which he used to discover new talents of the "nouvelle vague", including Jean-Pierre Melville, Jean-Luc Godard and Alain Resnais.

In 1966 he was the head of the jury at the 16th Berlin International Film Festival.

Braunberger had a close relationship with philosopher Gilles Deleuze.

In the late 1970s, Braunberger produced two films for Polish filmmaker Walerian Borowczyk.

Braunberger died in 1990.

Filmography 

 1929 : La Malemort du Canard (La Ballade du canard)
 1930 : La Route est belle
 1930 : 
 1930 : El Amor solfeando
 1930 : La Femme d'une nuit 
 1931 : La donna di una notte 
 1931 : On purge bébé
 1931 : La Chienne
 1931 : Salto Mortale 
 1931 : American Love 
 1933 : Tire au flanc
 1934 : Sans famille
 1936 : Partie de campagne
 1937 : The Cheat
 1947 : Van Gogh
 1947 : Paris 1900
 1948 : Van Gogh
 1949 : Le Trésor des Pieds-Nickelés
 1950 : Henri de Toulouse-Lautrec
 1950 : Histoire des pin-up girls
 1950 : Guernica
 1950 : Gauguin
 1950 : Le Tampon du capiston
 1951 : Station mondaine
 1951 : Palais royal
 1951 : Le Dictionnaire des pin-up girls
 1951 : L'Art du haut-rhénan
 1951 : The Bullfight documentary
 1951 : Bernard and the Lion
 1952 : En quête de Marie
 1952 : Avec André Gide
 1952 : Le Crime du Bouif
 1952 : Jocelyn
 1953 : Marc Chagall
 1953 : Julietta
 1954 : Croissance de Paris
 1954 : Ballade parisienne
 1955 : Visages de Paris
 1955 : Une lettre pour vous
 1955 : New York ballade
 1955 : Impressions de New York
 1956 : Toute la mémoire du monde
 1956 : Houston, Texas
 1956 : Le Grand sud
 1956 : Le Coup du berger
 1956 : Les Abeilles
 1958 : Moi un noir
 1958 : Elèves-maîtres
 1958 : Le Chant du styrène by Alain Resnais (short)
 1958 : Ces gens de Paris
 1958 : Bonjour, Monsieur La Bruyère
 1958 : Au bon coin
 1958 : L'Américain se détend
 1959 : Tous les garçons s'appellent Patrick (All the Boys Are Called Patrick)
 1960 : L'Amour existe by Maurice Pialat (short)
 1960 : L'Eau à la bouche
 1960 : L'Amérique insolite
 1960 : Tirez sur le pianiste (Shoot the Piano Player)
 1960 : Charlotte et son Jules
 1961 : Une histoire d'eau
 1962 : Un cœur gros comme ça
 1962 : La Dénonciation
 1962 : Virginie
 1962 : Vivre sa vie: Film en douze tableaux
 1963 : Delphica
 1964 : La Femme spectacle
 1964 : La Fleur de l'âge, ou Les adolescentes
 1964 : De l'amour
 1965 : Le Bestiaire d'amour
 1965 : L'Affaire de poissons
 1966 : Lumière
 1966 : Martin soldat by Michel Deville with Robert Hirsch
 1967 : L'Affaire de la rue de Chantilly (Le Crime de la rue de Chantilly) (TV)
 1968 : Erotissimo  by Gérard Pirès with Annie Girardot
 1969 : L'Astragale
 1969 : Libre de ne pas l'être
 1969 : Le Droit d'asile
 1969 : Cinéma-cinéma
 1970 : Trois Hommes sur un cheval by Marcel Moussy with Robert Dhéry
 1970 : Les Voisins n'aiment pas la musique
 1970 : La Fin des Pyrénées
 1970 : En attendant l'auto...
 1970 : Chambres de bonne
 1970 : Êtes-vous fiancée à un marin grec ou à un pilote de ligne ?  by Jean Aurel with Jean Yanne
 1971 : Les Doigts croisés (To Catch a Spy) by Dick Clement with Kirk Douglas
 1971 : Le Laboratoire de l'angoisse
 1971 : La Cavale
 1971 : Fantasia chez les ploucs by Gérard Pirès with Lino Ventura
 1971 : Petit à petit
 1972 : Je, tu, elles...
 1972 : On n'arrête pas le printemps
 1972 : Elle court, elle court la banlieue by Gérard Pirès with Marthe Keller
 1974 : Défense d'aimer
 1974 : Comment réussir quand on est con et pleurnichard
 1974 : Comme un pot de fraises  by Jean Aurel with Jean-Claude Brialy
 1975 : Emilienne
 1975 :   by Gérard Pirès with Jean-Louis Trintignant
 1975 : Attention les yeux ! by Gérard Pirès with Claude Brasseur
 1977 : Le Risque de vivre by Gérald Calderon with Michael Lonsdale
 1979 : L'Armoire
 1979 : Collections privées
 1983 : Kusa-meikyu
 1986 : Dionysus
 1989 : Aller à Dieppe sans voir la mer

See also
1929 in film

References 

1905 births
1990 deaths
20th-century French male actors
Male actors from Paris
French male film actors
French male television actors
French film producers
20th-century French Jews
César Honorary Award recipients